HMS Rigorous was an  destroyer which served with the Royal Navy during World War I. Launched on 30 September 1916, the vessel operated as part of the Grand Fleet, operating as part of destroyer flotillas hunting German ships that were attacking convoys. One flotilla was successful in destroying a Q ship in 1917. After the War, the destroyer was given a reduced complement and was sold to be broken up on 5 November 1926.

Design and development

Rigorous was one of seventeen  destroyers ordered by the British Admiralty in July 1915 as part of the Sixth War Construction Programme. The R class were a development of the preceding , but differed in having geared turbines, the central gun mounted on a bandstand and minor changes to improve seakeeping.

Armament consisted of three  Mk IV QF guns on the ship's centreline, with one on the forecastle, one aft on a raised platform and one between the second and third funnels. A single 2-pounder (40 mm) pom-pom anti-aircraft gun was carried, while torpedo armament consisted of two twin mounts for  torpedoes.  The ship had a complement of 82 officers and ratings.

Construction and career
Rigorous was laid down by John Brown & Company at Clydebank on the River Clyde on 22 September 1915 and launched on 30 September 1916, leaving the yard on 30 November that year. The destroyer was allocated the yard number 452.

On commissioning, Rigorous joined the 15th Destroyer Flotilla of the Grand Fleet. In October 1917, Rigorous formed part of a large-scale operation, involving 30 cruisers and 54 destroyers deployed in eight groups across the North Sea in an attempt to stop a suspected sortie by German naval forces. Despite these measures, the German light cruisers  and  managed to attack the regular convoy between Norway and Britain on 17 October, sinking nine merchant ships and two destroyers,  and  before returning safely to Germany.

After the Armistice, the ship initially remained with the Grand Fleet but was recommissioned with reduced complement on 30 October 1919. In 1923, the Navy decided to scrap many of the older destroyers in preparation for the introduction of newer and larger vessels. Rigorous was subsequently decommissioned and broken up by Cashmore at Newport on 5 November 1926.

Pennant numbers

References

Citations

Bibliography

 
 
 
 
 
 
 

1916 ships
Ships built on the River Clyde
R-class destroyers (1916)
World War I destroyers of the United Kingdom